Frederick W. Krez (October 22, 1899 – January 25, 1969) was an American politician and businessman.

Born in Sheboygan, Wisconsin, Krez served in the United States Marine Corps  during World War I. He went to Ripon College and then received his bachelor's degree from University of Wisconsin and his law degree from University of Wisconsin Law School. Krez practiced law in Plymouth, Wisconsin where he had lived. In 1931, Krez served in the Wisconsin State Assembly and was a Republican. Krez died of a heart attack in Chicago, Illinois. He was working in the Federal Estate and Gift Tax Division in Chicago at the time of his death, but still lived in Plymouth, Wisconsin. His father was Paul T. Krez who was the Sheboygan County judge and his grandfather was Conrad Krez who also served in the Wisconsin State Assembly.

Notes

1899 births
1969 deaths
Politicians from Sheboygan, Wisconsin
Ripon College (Wisconsin) alumni
University of Wisconsin–Madison alumni
University of Wisconsin Law School alumni
Military personnel from Wisconsin
Illinois lawyers
Wisconsin lawyers
Members of the Wisconsin State Assembly
20th-century American politicians
People from Plymouth, Wisconsin
20th-century American lawyers